NH 85 may refer to:

 National Highway 85 (India)
 New Hampshire Route 85, United States